The 2015–16 Biathlon World Cup – World Cup 7 was held in Canmore, Alberta, Canada, from 4 February until 7 February 2016.

Schedule of events

Medal winners

Men

Women

Mixed

References 

2015–16 Biathlon World Cup
Biathlon World Cup
Biathlon World Cup
February 2016 sports events in Canada
Biathlon competitions in Canada
Canmore, Alberta
Sport in Alberta